The 2022–23 Professional U21 Development League is the 11th season of the Professional Development League system.

The Premier League 2 reverted back to a U21 competition ahead of the 2022–23 season. Burnley, Birmingham City and Reading left the league after failing to retain category one academy status.

Premier League 2

Division 1

Table

Results

Division 2

Table

Results
</onlyinclude>

Play-offs

See also
 2022–23 in English football

References

2022–23 in English football leagues
2022–23